Yaneth Cajahuanca Rosales is a Peruvian politician. She was a Congresswoman representing Huánuco for the period 2006–2011, and belongs to the Union for Peru party.

References

Living people
Peruvian politicians of Quechua descent
Union for Peru politicians
Members of the Congress of the Republic of Peru
Year of birth missing (living people)
Women members of the Congress of the Republic of Peru